FA Youth Cup Finals from 1960 to 1969.

1968–69: Sunderland v. West Bromwich Albion (6–3 aggregate)

1967–68: Burnley v. Coventry City (1–2 and 2–0, 3–2 aggregate)

1966–67: Sunderland v. Birmingham City (1–0 and 1–0, 2–0 aggregate)

1965–66: Arsenal v. Sunderland (5–3 aggregate)

1964–65: Everton v. Arsenal (3–2 aggregate)

1963–64: Manchester United v. Swindon Town (1–1 and 4–1, 5–2 aggregate)

Second leg
Old Trafford, 30 April 1964
Manchester United - Swindon Town 4–1 (1–0)
1–0 44 min. David Sadler
2–0 46 min. David Sadler
2–1 68 min. Bruce Walker
3–1 70 min. David Sadler
4–1 87 min. John Aston
Attendance: 25,563

First leg
County Ground, 27 April 1964
Swindon Town - Manchester United 1–1 (1–0)
1–0 31 min. Don Rogers
1–1 70 min. George Best
Attendance: 17,000

1962–63: West Ham United v. Liverpool (1–3 and 5–2, 6–5 aggregate)

1961–62: Newcastle United vs. Wolverhampton Wanderers (2–1 aggregate)

1960–61: Chelsea v. Everton (5–3 aggregate)

1959–60: Chelsea v. Preston North End (1–1 and 4–1, 5–2 aggregate)

References

1960s
1959–60 in English football
1960–61 in English football
1961–62 in English football
1962–63 in English football
1963–64 in English football
1964–65 in English football
1965–66 in English football
1966–67 in English football
1967–68 in English football
1968–69 in English football